Luca De Dominicis (born 5 July 1973) is an Italian actor. He is best known for his walk-on role as King Herod in Mel Gibson's The Passion of the Christ.

Filmography

External links
 

1973 births
Living people
Male actors from Rome
21st-century Italian male actors
Italian male film actors
Place of birth missing (living people)